A topological soliton occurs when two adjoining structures or spaces are in some way "out of phase" with each other in ways that make a seamless transition between them impossible. One of the simplest and most commonplace examples of a topological soliton occurs in old-fashioned coiled telephone handset cords, which are usually coiled clockwise. Years of picking up the handset can end up coiling parts of the cord in the opposite counterclockwise direction, and when this happens there will be a distinctive larger loop that separates the two directions of coiling. This odd looking transition loop, which is neither clockwise nor counterclockwise, is an excellent example of a topological soliton. No matter how complex the context, anything that qualifies as a topological soliton must at some level exhibit this same simple issue of reconciliation seen in the twisted phone cord example.

Topological solitons arise with ease when creating the crystalline semiconductors used in modern electronics, and in that context their effects are almost always deleterious. For this reason such crystal transitions are called topological defects. However, this mostly solid-state terminology distracts from the rich and intriguing mathematical properties of such boundary regions. Thus for most non-solid-state contexts the more positive and mathematically rich phrase "topological soliton" is preferable.

A more detailed discussion of topological solitons and related topics is provided below.

In mathematics and physics, a topological soliton or a topological defect is a solution of a system of partial differential equations or of a quantum field theory homotopically distinct from the vacuum solution.

Overview

The existence of a topological defect can be demonstrated whenever the boundary conditions entail the existence of homotopically distinct solutions. Typically, this occurs because the boundary on which the conditions are specified has a non-trivial homotopy group which is preserved in differential equations; the solutions to the differential equations are then topologically distinct, and are classified by their homotopy class. Topological defects are not only stable against small perturbations, but cannot decay or be undone or be de-tangled, precisely because there is no continuous transformation that will map them (homotopically) to a uniform or "trivial" solution.

Formal classification

An ordered medium is defined as a region of space described by a function f(r)  that assigns to every point in the region an order parameter, and the possible values of the order parameter space constitute an order parameter space. The homotopy theory of defects uses the fundamental group of the order parameter space of a medium to discuss the existence, stability and classifications of topological defects in that medium.

Suppose R is the order parameter space for a medium, and let G be a Lie group of transformations on R. Let H be the symmetry subgroup of G for the medium. Then, the order parameter space can be written as the Lie group quotient R = G/H.

If G is a universal cover for G/H then, it can be shown that πn(G/H) = πn−1(H), where πi denotes the i-th homotopy group.

Various types of defects in the medium can be characterized by elements of various homotopy groups of the order parameter space. For example, (in three dimensions), line defects correspond to elements of π1(R), point defects correspond to elements of π2(R), textures correspond to elements of π3(R). However, defects which belong to the same conjugacy class of π1(R) can be deformed continuously to each other, and hence, distinct defects correspond to distinct conjugacy classes.

Poénaru and Toulouse showed that crossing defects get entangled if and only if they are members of separate conjugacy classes of π1(R).

Examples

Topological defects occur in partial differential equations and are believed to drive phase transitions in condensed matter physics.

The authenticity of a topological defect depends on the nature of the vacuum in which the system will tend towards if infinite time elapses;  false and true topological defects can be distinguished if the defect is in a false vacuum and a true vacuum, respectively.

Solitary wave PDEs

Examples include the soliton or solitary wave which occurs in exactly solvable models, such as

screw dislocations in crystalline materials,
skyrmion in quantum field theory, and
topological defects of the Wess–Zumino–Witten model.

Lambda transitions

Topological defects in lambda transition universality class systems including:

screw/edge-dislocations in liquid crystals,
magnetic flux "tubes" known as fluxons in superconductors, and
vortices in superfluids.

Cosmological defects

Topological defects, of the cosmological type, are extremely high-energy phenomena which are deemed impractical to produce in Earth-bound physics experiments.  Topological defects created during the universe's formation could theoretically be observed without significant energy expenditure.

In the Big Bang theory, the universe cools from an initial hot, dense state triggering a series of phase transitions much like what happens in condensed-matter systems such as superconductors.  Certain grand unified theories predict the formation of stable topological defects in the early universe during these phase transitions.

Symmetry breakdown 

Depending on the nature of symmetry breakdown, various solitons are believed to have formed in the early universe according to the Kibble-Zurek mechanism. The well-known topological defects are:

Cosmic strings are one-dimensional lines that form when an axial or cylindrical symmetry is broken.
Domain walls, two-dimensional membranes that form when a discrete symmetry is broken at a phase transition. These walls resemble the walls of a closed-cell foam, dividing the universe into discrete cells.
Monopoles, cube-like defects that form when a spherical symmetry is broken, are predicted to have magnetic charge, either north or south (and so are commonly called "magnetic monopoles").
Textures form when larger, more complicated symmetry groups are completely broken. They are not as localized as the other defects, and are unstable.
Skyrmions
Extra dimensions and higher dimensions.

Other more complex hybrids of these defect types are also possible.

As the universe expanded and cooled, symmetries in the laws of physics began breaking down in regions that spread at the speed of light; topological defects occur at the boundaries of adjacent regions. The matter composing these boundaries is in an ordered phase, which persists after the phase transition to the disordered phase is completed for the surrounding regions.

Observation
Topological defects have not been observed by astronomers; however, certain types are not compatible with current observations. In particular, if domain walls and monopoles were present in the observable universe, they would result in significant deviations from what astronomers can see.

Because of these observations, the formation of defects within the observable universe is highly constrained, requiring special circumstances (see Inflation (cosmology)). On the other hand, cosmic strings have been suggested as providing the initial 'seed'-gravity around which the large-scale structure of the cosmos of matter has condensed. Textures are similarly benign. In late 2007, a cold spot in the cosmic microwave background provided evidence of a possible texture.

Condensed matter

In condensed matter physics, the theory of homotopy groups provides a natural setting for description and classification of defects in ordered systems. Topological methods have been used in several problems of condensed matter theory. Poénaru and Toulouse used topological methods to obtain a condition for line (string) defects in liquid crystals that can cross each other without entanglement. It was a non-trivial application of topology that first led to the discovery of peculiar hydrodynamic behavior in the A-phase of superfluid helium-3.

Stable defects

Homotopy theory is deeply related to the stability of topological defects. In the case of line defect, if the closed path can be continuously deformed into one point, the defect is not stable, and otherwise, it is stable.

Unlike in cosmology and field theory, topological defects in condensed matter have been experimentally observed. Ferromagnetic materials have regions of magnetic alignment separated by domain walls. Nematic and bi-axial nematic liquid crystals display a variety of defects including monopoles, strings, textures etc.

Images

See also

 Condensed matter
 Differential equation
 Dislocation
 Quantum mechanics
 Quantum topology
 Quantum vortex
 Topological entropy in physics
 Topological excitations
 Topological manifold
 Topological order
 Topological quantum field theory
 Topological quantum number
 Topological string theory
 Topology
 Vector soliton

References

External links
Cosmic Strings & other Topological Defects
 http://demonstrations.wolfram.com/SeparationOfTopologicalSingularities/

 
Large-scale structure of the cosmos
Inflation (cosmology)